The following outline is provided as an overview of and topical guide to the Marshall Islands:

The Republic of the Marshall Islands (RMI) is a sovereign Micronesian island nation located in the western North Pacific Ocean, north of Nauru and Kiribati, east of the Federated States of Micronesia, and south of the U.S. territory of Wake Island, to which it lays claim.

General reference 

 Pronunciation:
 Common English country name:  The Marshall Islands
 Official English country name:  The Republic of the Marshall Islands
 Common endonym(s):  
 Official endonym(s):  
 Adjectival(s): Marshallese
 Demonym(s):
 Etymology: Name of the Marshall Islands
 ISO country codes:  MH, MHL, 584
 ISO region codes:  See ISO 3166-2:MH
 Internet country code top-level domain:  .mh

Geography of the Marshall Islands 

Geography of the Marshall Islands
 The Marshall Islands are: an island country
 Location:
 Northern Hemisphere and Eastern Hemisphere
 Pacific Ocean
 North Pacific Ocean
 Oceania
 Micronesia
 Time zone:  UTC+12
 Extreme points of the Marshall Islands
 High:  unnamed location on Likiep 
 Low:  North Pacific Ocean 0 m
 Land boundaries:  none
 Coastline:  North Pacific Ocean 370.4 km
 Population of the Marshall Islands: 

 Area of the Marshall Islands: 
 Atlas of the Marshall Islands

Environment of the Marshall Islands 

 Climate of the Marshall Islands
 Renewable energy in the Marshall Islands
 Geology of the Marshall Islands
 Protected areas of the Marshall Islands
 Biosphere reserves in the Marshall Islands
 National parks of the Marshall Islands
 Wildlife of the Marshall Islands
 Fauna of the Marshall Islands
 Birds of the Marshall Islands
 Mammals of the Marshall Islands

Natural geographic features of the Marshall Islands 

 Fjords of the Marshall Islands: None
 Glaciers of the Marshall Islands: None
 Islands of the Marshall Islands
 Lakes of the Marshall Islands
 Mountains of the Marshall Islands
 Volcanoes in the Marshall Islands
 Rivers of the Marshall Islands
 Waterfalls of the Marshall Islands
 Valleys of the Marshall Islands
 World Heritage Sites in the Marshall Islands: None

Regions of the Marshall Islands 

Regions of the Marshall Islands

Ecoregions of the Marshall Islands 

List of ecoregions in the Marshall Islands
 Ecoregions in the Marshall Islands

Administrative divisions of the Marshall Islands 
None

Municipalities of the Marshall Islands 

 Capital of the Marshall Islands: Majuro
 Cities of the Marshall Islands

Demography of the Marshall Islands 

Demographics of the Marshall Islands

Government and politics of the Marshall Islands 

Politics of the Marshall Islands
Form of government:
 Capital of the Marshall Islands: Majuro
 Elections in the Marshall Islands
 Political parties in the Marshall Islands

Branches of the government of the Marshall Islands 

Government of the Marshall Islands

Executive branch of the government of the Marshall Islands 
 Head of state: President of the Marshall Islands,
 Head of government: Prime Minister of the Marshall Islands,
 Cabinet of the Marshall Islands

Foreign relations of the Marshall Islands 

Foreign relations of the Marshall Islands
 Diplomatic missions in the Marshall Islands
 Diplomatic missions of the Marshall Islands
 United States-the Marshall Islands relations

Legislative branch of the government of the Marshall Islands 

 Parliament of the Marshall Islands (bicameral)
 Upper house: Senate of the Marshall Islands
 Lower house: House of Commons of the Marshall Islands

Judicial branch of the government of the Marshall Islands 

Court system of the Marshall Islands
 Supreme Court of the Marshall Islands
 High Court of the Marshall Islands

International organization membership 
The Republic of the Marshall Islands is a member of:

African, Caribbean, and Pacific Group of States (ACP)
Asian Development Bank (ADB)
Food and Agriculture Organization (FAO)
Group of 77 (G77)
International Atomic Energy Agency (IAEA)
International Bank for Reconstruction and Development (IBRD)
International Civil Aviation Organization (ICAO)
International Criminal Court (ICCt)
International Criminal Police Organization (Interpol)
International Development Association (IDA)
International Finance Corporation (IFC)
International Labour Organization (ILO)
International Maritime Organization (IMO)

International Mobile Satellite Organization (IMSO)
International Monetary Fund (IMF)
International Olympic Committee (IOC)
International Telecommunication Union (ITU)
Organisation for the Prohibition of Chemical Weapons (OPCW)
Pacific Islands Forum (PIF)
Secretariat of the Pacific Community (SPC)
South Pacific Regional Trade and Economic Cooperation Agreement (Sparteca)
United Nations (UN)
United Nations Conference on Trade and Development (UNCTAD)
United Nations Educational, Scientific, and Cultural Organization (UNESCO)
World Health Organization (WHO)

Law and order in the Marshall Islands 

Law of the Marshall Islands
 Constitution of the Marshall Islands
 Crime in the Marshall Islands
 Human rights in the Marshall Islands
 LGBT rights in the Marshall Islands
 Freedom of religion in the Marshall Islands
 Law enforcement in the Marshall Islands

Military of the Marshall Islands 

Military of the Marshall Islands
 Command
 Commander-in-chief:
 Ministry of Defence of the Marshall Islands
 Forces
 Army of the Marshall Islands
 Navy of the Marshall Islands
 Air Force of the Marshall Islands
 Special forces of the Marshall Islands
 Military history of the Marshall Islands
 Military ranks of the Marshall Islands

Local government in the Marshall Islands 

Local government in the Marshall Islands

History of the Marshall Islands 

 Military history of the Marshall Islands

Culture of the Marshall Islands 

Culture of the Marshall Islands
 Architecture of the Marshall Islands
 Cuisine of the Marshall Islands
 Festivals in the Marshall Islands
 Languages of the Marshall Islands
 Media in the Marshall Islands
 National symbols of the Marshall Islands
 Coat of arms of the Marshall Islands
 Flag of the Marshall Islands
 National anthem of the Marshall Islands
 People of the Marshall Islands
 Public holidays in the Marshall Islands
 Records of the Marshall Islands
 Religion in the Marshall Islands
 Christianity in the Marshall Islands
 Hinduism in the Marshall Islands
 Islam in the Marshall Islands
 Judaism in the Marshall Islands
 Sikhism in the Marshall Islands
 World Heritage Sites in the Marshall Islands: None

Art in the Marshall Islands 
 Art in the Marshall Islands
 Cinema of the Marshall Islands
 Literature of the Marshall Islands
 Music of the Marshall Islands
 Television in the Marshall Islands
 Theatre in the Marshall Islands

Sports in the Marshall Islands 

Sports in the Marshall Islands
 Football in the Marshall Islands

Economy and infrastructure of the Marshall Islands 

Economy of the Marshall Islands
 Economic rank, by nominal GDP (2007): 187th (one hundred and eighty seventh)
 Agriculture in the Marshall Islands
 Banking in the Marshall Islands
 National Bank of the Marshall Islands
 Communications in the Marshall Islands
 Internet in the Marshall Islands
 Companies of the Marshall Islands
Currency of the Marshall Islands: Dollar
ISO 4217: USD
 Energy in the Marshall Islands
 Energy policy of the Marshall Islands
 Oil industry in the Marshall Islands
 Mining in the Marshall Islands
 Tourism in the Marshall Islands
 Transport in the Marshall Islands
 the Marshall Islands Stock Exchange

Education in the Marshall Islands 

Education in the Marshall Islands

Infrastructure of the Marshall Islands
 Health care in the Marshall Islands
 Transportation in the Marshall Islands
 Airports in the Marshall Islands
 Rail transport in the Marshall Islands
 Roads in the Marshall Islands
 Water supply and sanitation in the Marshall Islands

See also 

Marshall Islands
Index of Marshall Islands-related articles
List of international rankings
Member state of the United Nations
Outline of geography
Outline of Oceania

References

External links 

 Government
 Office of the President
 Embassy of the Republic of the Marshall Islands Washington, DC official government site

 News
 Marshall Islands Journal Weekly independent national newspaper

 Overviews
 CIA World Factbook - Marshall Islands
 Digital Micronesia - Marshalls by Dirk HR Spennemann, Associate Professor in Cultural Heritage Management
 Plants & Environments of the Marshall Islands Book turned website by Dr. Mark Merlin of the University of Hawaii
 Atomic Testing Information
 Pictures of victims of US nuclear testing in the Marshall Islands on Nuclear Files.org

Marshall Islands